Devikulam is a Grama Panchayat and small hill station of about  from Munnar in the Idukki District of Kerala State, India.

Etymology
The name Devikulam is a conjunction of the words Devi, from the goddess Devi and kulam, meaning pond.

Demographics
As of 2011 Census, Devikulam Grama Panchayat had a population of 23,709 among which 11,912 are males and 11,797 are females. The total number of families in the Panchayat limits were 6,166.  The average sex ratio was 990, lower than the state average of 1084. In Devikulam, 8% of the population was under 6 years of age. Devikulam had an average literacy of 86.3%, lower than the state average of 94%.

History 

According to legend, the goddess Sita Devi of the Ramayana epic bathed in the beautiful Devikulam lake waters surrounded by lush, green hills, now named Sita Devi Lake. The lake draws tourists not only because of its sacredness but also for the curative powers of its mineral waters. Most of the inhabitants in this town speak Malayalam. Nearby, are the scenic Pallivasal Waterfalls, dense, green tea plantations, and the natural vegetation of slim red and blue and yellow gum trees.

Gallery

References

External links

 Map of area

Hill stations in Kerala
Populated places in the Western Ghats
Villages in Idukki district
Munnar